Dhabak (Gujarati: ધબક) is a quarterly Gujarati language ghazal poetry journal published from Gujarat, India which is edited by Rashid Meer. It is dedicated to the growth and publicizing of Gujarati ghazal and its form.

History
Dhabak was founded in 1991 by Rashid Meer after the suggestion of Jayant Pathak, a Gujarati author. Pravin Darji suggested the name of the journal.

Content
Dhabak publishes ghazals, criticism and review of ghazal anthology, biography and interview of ghazal poets. It also publishes important articles on Urdu ghazal poets and their works.

See also
 Gazalvishwa
 Kavilok

References

1991 establishments in Gujarat
Gujarati-language magazines
Literary magazines published in India
Quarterly magazines published in India
Magazines established in 1991
Poetry literary magazines